Adnan Güngör (born 20 September 1980) is a Turkish professional footballer who last played as a defensive midfielder for Sakaryaspor. He has been capped by the Turkey national under-21 football team.

References

External links

1980 births
Living people
Turkey under-21 international footballers
Samsunspor footballers
Trabzonspor footballers
Hacettepe S.K. footballers
Diyarbakırspor footballers
Konyaspor footballers
Adanaspor footballers
Karşıyaka S.K. footballers
Turkish footballers
TFF First League players
Association football midfielders